Zodarion murphyorum is a spider species found in Spain.

See also 
 List of Zodariidae species

References

External links 

murphyorum
Spiders of Europe
Spiders described in 1994